Nadu a term used to mean land, country, place, domicile, etc. in Dravidian languages.

It can refer to:

Tamil Nadu, one of the 28 states of India
Ancient Tamil regions in southern India
Chola Nadu
Pandiya Nadu
Kongu Nadu
Tondai Nadu
Nadu or Nad, any of the numerous city-states existed in present-day Kerala state, South India
Tulu Nadu, Tulu speaking region spread over to parts of present Karnataka and Kerala States of India
Male Nadu, Malayala Nadu are literary terms, which refer to state of Kerala, India
Nadu, Iran, a village in Kerman Province, Iran
Kamma Nadu or Kammanadu, also Kammarashtra, is a home land of Kammas. Kammanadu is a region encompassing Bellamkonda, Amaravati, Jaggayyapeta, Ongole, Chirala, Bapatla and Narasaraopeta of Guntur, Prakasam and Krishna districts. Reference to Kammarashtra is made by Andhra Ikshvakus in Jaggayyapeta of Krishna district in 3rd century A. D.
Pakanadu a region corresponding to parts of Prakasam and Nellore Districts of Andhra Pradesh.
Palnadu is a region in present-day Guntur District of Andhra Pradesh. 
Renadu, a region in Kadapa district. 
Vela Nadu a region in present-day Guntur District of Andhra Pradesh.
Vengi Nadu or Venginadu or Veginadu, a region originally corresponding to parts of present-day Godavari, Krishna and Visakhapatnam districts.
Dravida Nadu, also known as Dravidistan or Dravidasthan, was the name of a proposed sovereign state for all non-Brahmin speakers of Dravidian languages in South Asia